Paul Jennings AM (born 1943), is an English-born Australian children's book writer. His books mainly feature short stories that lead the reader through an unusual series of events that end with a twist. Many of his stories were adapted for the cult classic children's television series Round the Twist. Jennings collaborated with Morris Gleitzman on the book series Wicked!, which was adapted into an animated TV series in 2000.

Early life and education
Paul Jennings was born on 30 April 1943 in Heston, Middlesex (now part of Hounslow in London). In 1949 his family emigrated to Australia. He first attended Bentleigh West Primary School in Bentleigh, a suburb of Melbourne, and then Caulfield Grammar School.

He graduated with a Bachelor of Education Studies from Frankston Teachers College at Monash University in 1978 and taught at Frankston State School, Kangaroo Flat State School, the Turana Youth Training Centre and the Royal Children's Hospital State School in Mount Eliza. He then went to the Lincoln Institute of Health Sciences (now part of Monash).

Career
After graduating, he became a speech pathologist that he became a lecturer in special education at the Burwood State College and then, in 1979, Senior Lecturer in Language and Literature at Warrnambool Institute of Advanced Education (both now part of Deakin University).

In 1985, Jennings' first book of short stories, Unreal!, was published, during which he worked as a teacher, lecturer and speech therapist. In 1989, he made the decision to devote himself full-time to writing. He began writing for children when his son, aged 11, was having trouble reading.

Jennings' short stories were adapted for the first two seasons of children's television series Round the Twist in 1989 and 1992, and then later in 1998 for the only season of series Driven Crazy.

In 2020 Jennings' memoir, Untwisted: The Story of My Life, was published by Allen & Unwin. Jennings started writing it ten years earlier, and is his longest piece of writing. In it, he examines many aspects of his life, including harbouring feelings of guilt about not liking his cold and emotionally abusive father, and having thoughts of attacking him with a hammer.

Personal life
Jennings first married aged 22. He has six children, and is a great-grandfather. His third wife is comedian Mary-Anne Fahey.

Awards and honours
In 1992, Jennings received a Gold Puffin Award, for selling one million books in Australia.
In 1993 he won an Angus & Robertson Bookworld Award, as Australian Author – Children's Literary Medal Criteria, "Best Selling Author" and "Most Valued Author".
In 1993 Jennings was made Victorian of the Year – Western Region, presented by the Australia Day (Victoria) Committee, for services to the Victorian community.
 In 1995 he was appointed Member in the General Division of the Order of Australia (AM), in the Australia Day 1995 Honours List, for service to children's literature.
In 1998 he was named Favourite Australian Author in Dymocks Children's Choice Awards.
In 2000 he was awarded the Dromkeen Medal, for significant contributions to the appreciation and development of children's literature.
In 2010 he was made a Fellow of Monash University.
In 2019 he received a Lifetime Achievement Award from the Children's Book Council of Australia.

Awards for titles

Young Australians' Best Book Award (YABBA):
 1987 Unreal! – Winner, best book for older readers;
 1988 Unbelievable! – Winner, best book for older readers;
 1989 Uncanny! – Winner, best book for older readers;
 1989  The Cabbage Patch Fib – Winner, best book for younger readers;
 1990 The Paw Thing – Winner, best book for younger readers;
 1991 Round The Twist – Winner, best book for older readers;
 1992 Quirky Tails – Winner, fiction for younger readers;
 1992 Unmentionable! – Winner, fiction for older readers;
 1993 Unbearable! – Winner, fiction for older readers;
 1994 Spooner Or Later – Winner, picture book section;
 1994 Undone! – Winner, fiction for younger readers;
 1995 Duck For Cover – Winner, picture book section;
 1995 The Gizmo – Winner, fiction for younger readers;
 1996 The Gizmo Again – Winner, fiction for younger readers;
 1998 Wicked! – Winner, fiction for older readers;
 2002 Tongue Tied – Winner, fiction for Younger Readers.

Canberra's Own Outstanding List (COOL Award):
 1991 Round The Twist – Winner, Primary Section;
 1992 The Cabbage Patch Fib – Winner, Primary Section;
 1993 Unreal! – Winner, Primary Section;
 1995 The Gizmo – Winner, Primary Section;
 1997 The Paw Thing – Winner, Secondary Section;
 1998 Wicked! – Winner, Primary Section;
 2001  The Paw Thing – Winner, Coolest Book of the Decade.

West Australian Young Readers' Book Award (WAYRBA):
 1989 Unreal! – Winner of Special Award, Highest Ranked Australian Author, Secondary Readers Section;
 1991 The Paw Thing – Winner of Hoffman Award, Highest Ranked Australian Author and Primary Readers Section;
 1992 Uncanny! – Winner of Hoffman Award, Highest Ranked Australian Author and Primary Readers Section;
 1994 Unbearable! – Winner of Hoffman Award, Highest Ranked Australian Author and Primary Readers Section;
 1995 Undone! – Winner of Hoffman Award, Highest Ranked Australian Author and Primary Readers Section.

Kids Own Australian Literature Award (KOALA):
 1990 Unreal! – Winner Secondary Readers Section;
 1992 Unmentionable! – Winner Infant/Primary Readers Section;
 1993 Unbearable! – Winner Infant/Primary Readers Section;
 1994 Undone! – Winner Infant/Primary Readers Section;
 1995 Duck For Cover – Winner Infant/Primary Readers Section;
 1996 Uncovered! – Winner Senior Book.

Kids Reading Oz Choice Award (KROC):
 1990 Uncanny! – Winner Most Popular Oz Book;
 1991 Unbelievable! – Winner Most Popular Oz Book;
 1992 Unreal! – Winner Most Popular Oz Book;
 1993 Undone! – Winner Most Popular Oz Book;
 1994 Undone! – Winner Most Popular Oz Book;
 1995 The Gizmo – Winner Most Popular Oz Book;
 1996 Round the Twist – Winner Most Popular Oz Book;
 1997 Wicked! – Winner Most Popular Oz Book;
 1998 Wicked! – Winner Most Popular Oz Book;
 1999 The Gizmo – Best Oz Children's Book;
 2000 – No.s 1, 3, 4, 6, 7 and 10 in the Top Ten Books.

Books I Love Best Yearly (BILBY Award):
 1992 Unreal! – Winner Read Alone Primary Section;
 1994 Undone! – Winner Read Alone Primary Section;
 1996 The Gizmo – Winner Read Australian Primary Section.

Australian Writers' Guild:
 1990, AWGIE Award – Best Children's Adaptation (TV) Round The Twist;
 1993, AWGIE Award – Best Children's Adaptation (TV) Round The Twist – Episode 5.

ABPA Joyce Nicholson Award:
 1993, Spooner Or Later – winner, best designed children's book of the year.

Wilderness Society Environment Award for Children's Literature:
 1994, Picture Book – The Fisherman and the Theefyspray.

Prix Jeunesse Award:
 1994 – Winner Round The Twist (Television Series).

Australian Publishers Association – Book Industry Awards:
 1997 – Peoples Choice Award for Children's Books for Come Back Gizmo.

Christian Schools' Book Award:
 1998 – awarded to Paul Jennings and Jane Tanner for The Fisherman and the Theefyspray.

Dymocks Children's Choice Awards:
 1998 – Favourite Australian Younger Reader Book, Sink The Gizmo;
 1998 – Favourite Australian Older Reader Book, Wicked.

Queensland Premiers Literary Award:
 1999 – Best Children's Book Unseen!.

Bibliography

Short story collections
 Unreal! Eight Surprising Stories (1985)
 Unbelievable! More Surprising Stories (1986)
 Quirky Tails! More Oddball Stories (1987)
 Uncanny! Even More Surprising Stories (1988)
 Unbearable! More Bizarre Stories (1990)
 Unmentionable! More Amazing Stories (1991)
 The Naked Ghost, Burp! and Blue Jam (1991)
 Undone! More Mad Endings (1993)
 Uncovered! Weird, Weird Stories (1995)
 Unseen! (1998)
 Tongue Tied! (2002)

Picture books

Rascal series

 Rascal The Dragon
 Rascal in Trouble
 Rascal's Trick
 Rascal Takes Off
 Rascal at the Show
 Rascal and the Cheese
 Rascal And Little Flora
 Rascal and the Hot Air Balloon
 Rascal and the Monster
 Rascal Goes Fishing
 Rascal and the Dragon Droppings
 Little Rascal to the Rescue
 Rascal Plays Up
 Rascal Runs Away
 Rascal's Shadow
 Rascal and the Bad Smell
 Rascal Bumps His Head
 Rascal's Big Day

Miscellaneous
 Teacher Eater (1991)
 Grandad's Gifts (1992)
 The Fisherman and the Theefyspray (1994)

Chapter books

Cabbage Patch series

 The Cabbage Patch Fib (1988)
 The Cabbage Patch War (1996)
 The Cabbage Patch Pong (2002)
 The Cabbage Patch Curse (2004)

Gizmo series
 The Gizmo (1994)
 The Gizmo Again (1995)
 Come Back Gizmo (1996)
 Sink The Gizmo (1997)

Singenpoo series
 The Paw Thing (1989)
 Singenpoo Strikes Again (1998)
 Singenpoo Shoots Through (1999)
 Singenpoo's Secret Weapon (2001)

Miscellaneous
 The Spitting Rat (1999)
 Sucked In (2000)
 Maggot (2003)

Novels

Deadly series (co-written with Morris Gleitzman)

 Nude (2000)
 Brats (2000)
 Stiff (2000)
 Hunt (2000)
 Grope (2000)
 Pluck (2000)

Wicked series (co-written with Morris Gleitzman)

 The Slobberers (1997)
 Battering Rams (1997)
 Croaked (1997)
 Dead Ringer (1997)
 The Creeper (1997)
 Till Death Do Us Apart (1997)

Miscellaneous
 How Hedley Hopkins Did a Dare (2005)
 The Nest (2009)

Puzzle and joke books

 Spooner or Later (1992)
 Freeze A Crowd (1996)
 Duck For Cover (1997)
 Spit It Out (2003)

Compilations and bind-ups

 Thirteen! Unpredictable Tales (1995)
 Wicked: All six books in one (1998)
 Uncollected: Every Story from Unreal!, Unbelievable!, and Quirky Tails (1998)
 Uncollected: Volume Two: Every Story from Uncanny!, Unbearable!, and Unmentionable! (1999)
 Uncollected: Volume Three: Every Story from Undone!, Uncovered!, and Unseen! (2000)
 Deadly: All six books in one (2000)
 The Fantastic And Amazing Gizmo (2002)
 The Many Adventures of Singenpoo (2002)
 The Cabbage Patch Fibs (2002)
 Paul Jennings' Funniest Stories (2005)
 Paul Jennings' Weirdest Stories (2006)
 Paul Jennings' Spookiest Stories (2007)
 Paul Jennings' Trickiest stories (2008)
 Unreal! The Ultimate Collection: 30 Stories in 30 Years (2015)

Miscellaneous
 Round the Twist (1989)
 Round The Twist #1: Pink Bow Tie & Nails (a graphic novel) (1993)
 The Paul Jennings Superdiary 1996
 The Paul Jennings Superdiary 1997
 The Paul Jennings Superdiary 2002
 The Reading Bug...and how you can help your child to catch it (2008)
 The Bird Said Nothing (eBook) (2012)

Memoir

Critical studies and reviews of Jennings' work 
Untwisted

Television
 Round The Twist (1990/2001)
 Driven Crazy (1998)
 Wicked! (2000-2001)

See also
 List of Caulfield Grammar School people

References

External links
 Paul Jennings' official website
 Paul Jennings' autobiography
 Paul Jennings Interview
 Paul Jennings at The Internet Movie Database
 Profile from The Age

1943 births
Living people
20th-century Australian novelists
21st-century Australian novelists
Australian children's writers
Australian male novelists
Australian male short story writers
English emigrants to Australia
Members of the Order of Australia
People educated at Caulfield Grammar School
20th-century Australian short story writers
21st-century Australian short story writers
20th-century Australian male writers
21st-century Australian male writers
People from Bentleigh, Victoria
People from Heston